OJM may refer to:

Mozambican Youth Organisation (Organização da Juventude Moçambicana)
Oregon Jewish Museum
OJM (band), an Italian rock band